The Westchester Polo Club was the first formal American polo club. It was established in the spring of 1876. Events were held at the Jerome Park Racetrack in New York. The club  was responsible for the International Polo Cup. The club moved to Newport, Rhode Island.

Members
James Gordon Bennett, Jr. (cofounder)
John Schuyler Crosby (cofounder)

References

Polo clubs in the United States
1876 establishments in New York (state)
Jerome Park, Bronx